Malek Hasan Yarijan (also Romanized as Malek Ḩasan Yārījān; also known as Malekḩasan) is a village in Jalalvand Rural District, Firuzabad District, Kermanshah County, Kermanshah Province, Iran. At the 2006 census, its population was 72, in 15 families.

References 

Populated places in Kermanshah County